The 1913 Michigan State Normal Normalites football team was an American football team that represented Michigan State Normal College (later renamed Eastern Michigan University) as an independent during the 1913 college football season.  In their second and final season under head coach Leroy Brown, the Normalites compiled a 2–3–1 recprd and were outscored by a total of 72 to 44. S. B. Crouse was the team captain.

Schedule

References

Michigan State Normal
Eastern Michigan Eagles football seasons
Michigan State Normal Normalites football